"New York City" is the first single by industrial metal band Emigrate. It has been considered the band's most successful song.

The promo version of the single has an alternative cover. The gas mask has a burning building instead of a woman reflected in lenses. In the music video to the song, band frontman Richard Kruspe can be seen walking through New York City and sitting down and singing. 

Till Lindemann stated that Kruspe does "[an] incredible job at singing and makes the song perfect in every way, who would have known my fellow German guitarist would now be singing in great American dialect, I'm very proud of Rick".

Track listing

CD single
 New York City (Single Edit) – 3:26
 Blood – 3:34
 My World – 4:17
 New York City (Eat Your Heart Out Remix by Alec Empire) – 3:49
 My World ("Resident Evil: Extinction" Video) – 4:21

7" vinyl single
 New York City (Eat Your Heart Out Remix by Alec Empire) 3:49
 My World  4:17

Promo
 New York City (Single Edit) – 3:26
 New York City (Eat Your Heart Out Remix by Alec Empire) – 3:49

Release history

References 

2007 singles
Emigrate (band) songs